The Estádio Nacional do Chiazi is a multi-use stadium in Cabinda, Angola.  Completed in 2010, it is used mostly for football matches. The stadium hosted some events for the 2010 African Cup of Nations. It holds 20,000 people.

References

External links
Venue information 
Stadium information
Photographs of the Stadium

Chiazi
Cabinda Province
2010 Africa Cup of Nations
Sports venues completed in 2010
2010 establishments in Angola